James Madison Hughes (April 7, 1809 – February 26, 1861) was a U.S. Representative from Missouri.

Born in Bourbon County, Kentucky, Hughes received a liberal schooling.
He studied law.
He was admitted to the bar and practiced in Liberty, Missouri.
He also engaged in mercantile pursuits in Liberty.
He served as member of the State house of representatives in 1839.

Hughes was elected as a Democrat to the Twenty-eighth Congress (March 4, 1843 – March 3, 1845).
He moved to St. Louis, Missouri, in 1855 and engaged in the banking business.
He died in Jefferson City, Missouri on February 26, 1861 and was buried at Bellefontaine Cemetery in St. Louis.

References

1809 births
1861 deaths
Democratic Party members of the Missouri House of Representatives
Democratic Party members of the United States House of Representatives from Missouri
19th-century American politicians